Francis Loftus Sullivan (6 January 1903 – 19 November 1956) was an English film and stage actor.

Early life
Francis Loftus Sullivan was born in London on 6 January 1903. His parents were Mr. and Mrs. Michael Sullivan, and he had two brothers and a sister. He attended Stonyhurst, a Jesuit public school, and had additional schooling in Neuchatel, Switzerland, He initially planned to be an engineer.

Career
A heavily built man with a striking double-chin and a deep voice, Sullivan made his acting debut at the Old Vic at age 18 in Shakespeare's Richard III. He had considerable theatrical experience before he appeared in his first film in 1932, The Missing Rembrandt, as a German villain opposite Arthur Wontner as Sherlock Holmes.

Among his film roles are Mr Bumble in Oliver Twist (1948) and Phil Nosseross in the film noir Night and the City (1950). Sullivan also played the part of the lawyer Jaggers in two versions of Charles Dickens's Great Expectations - in 1934 and 1946. He appeared in a fourth Dickens film, the 1935 Universal Pictures version of The Mystery of Edwin Drood, in which he played Crisparkle.

He was featured in The Citadel (1938), starring Robert Donat, and a decade later he played the role of Pierre Cauchon in the technicolor version of Joan of Arc (1948), starring Ingrid Bergman. In 1938 he starred in a revival of the Stokes brothers' play Oscar Wilde at London's Arts Theatre.  He played the Attorney-General prosecuting the case defended by Robert Donat as barrister Sir Robert Morton, in the first film version of The Winslow Boy (1948).

Sullivan also acted in light comedies, including My Favorite Spy (1951), starring Bob Hope and Hedy Lamarr, in which he played an enemy agent, and the comedy Fiddlers Three (1944), portraying Nero. He also played the role of Pothinus in the film version of George Bernard Shaw's Caesar and Cleopatra (1945). The film was directed by Gabriel Pascal, and was the last film personally supervised by Shaw himself. Sullivan reprised the role in a stage revival of the play.

On television, Sullivan starred in "The Man Who Would Be King", the 17 October 1950, episode of Suspense.

Sullivan, who became a naturalised American citizen on 27 December 1954, won a Tony Award in 1955 for the Agatha Christie play Witness for the Prosecution. Earlier, he had played Hercule Poirot at London's Embassy Theatre in the Christie play Black Coffee (1930).

Personal life and death 
In 1935, Sullivan married stage designer Frances Joan Perkins in Westminster in London. In 1939 they were living at 'Hatch Hill' on Kingsley Green at Fernhurst in West Sussex. They remained married until his death.

Sullivan died on 19 November 1956 in Mount Sinai Hospital in New York City, aged 53.

Filmography

The Missing Rembrandt (1932) as Baron von Guntermann (film debut)
The Chinese Puzzle (1932) as Herman Strumm
When London Sleeps (1932) as Rodney Haines
Called Back (1933) as Kaledin
F.P.1 Doesn't Answer (1933) as A Sailor
The Wandering Jew (1933) as Archbishop Juan de Texada
Red Wagon (1933) as Cranley
The Right to Live (1933) as Roger Stoneham
The Fire Raisers (1934) as Stedding
The Warren Case (1934) as Prosecuting Counsel (uncredited)
The Return of Bulldog Drummond (1934) as Carl Peterson
Princess Charming (1934) as Alakiev
Chu Chin Chow (1934) as The Caliph
What Happened Then? (1934) as Richard Bentley, Prosecution Counsel
Jew Süss (1934) as Remchingen (uncredited)
Great Expectations (1934) as Jaggers
Cheating Cheaters (1934) as Dr. George Brockton
Strange Wives (1934) as Bellamy
The Mystery of Edwin Drood (1935) as Rev. Mr. Septimus Crisparkle
Her Last Affaire (1935) as Sir Julian Weyre
A Woman Alone (1936) as Prosecutor
The Interrupted Honeymoon (1936) as Alphonse
Spy of Napoleon (1936) as Chief of Police
The Limping Man (1936) as Theodore Disher
Action for Slander (1937) as Sir Quinton Jessops
The Wasp's Nest (1937, TV) as Hercule Poirot 
Non-Stop New York (1937) as Hugo Brant
Dinner at the Ritz (1937) as Brogard
Fine Feathers (1937) as Hugo Steinway
The Drum (1938) as Governor
Kate Plus Ten (1938) as Lord Flamborough
The Citadel (1938) as Ben Chenkin
Climbing High (1938) as Madman
The Ware Case (1938) as Prosecuting Attorney
The Gables Mystery (1938) as Power
The Four Just Men (1939) as Léon Poiccard
Young Man's Fancy (1939) as Blackbeard, Vincent St George
21 Days (1940) as Mander
"Pimpernel" Smith (1941) as General von Graum
The Day Will Dawn (1942) as Kommandant Ulrich Wettau
The Foreman Went to France (1942) as French Skipper
Lady from Lisbon (1942) as Minghetti
The Butler's Dilemma (1943) as Leo Carrington
Fiddlers Three (1944) as Nero
Caesar and Cleopatra (1945) as Pothinus
The Laughing Lady (1946) as Sir Williams Tremayne
Great Expectations (1946) as Mr. Jaggers
The Man Within (1947) as Mr. Braddock
Take My Life (1947) as Prosecuting Counsel
Broken Journey (1948) as Perami
Oliver Twist (1948) as Mr. Bumble
The Winslow Boy (1948) as Attorney General
Joan of Arc (1948) as Pierre Cauchon (Count-Bishop of Beauvais)
Christopher Columbus (1949) as Francisco de Bobadilla
The Red Danube (1949) as Colonel Humphrey 'Blinker' Omicron
Night and the City (1950) as Philip Nosseross
Behave Yourself! (1951) as Fat Freddy
My Favorite Spy (1951) as Karl Brubaker
Caribbean Gold (1952) as Andrew MacAllister
Sangaree (1953) as Dr. Bristol
Plunder of the Sun (1953) as Thomas Berrien
Drums of Tahiti (1954) as Commissioner Pierre Duvois
The Prodigal (1955) as Bosra
Hell's Island (1955) as Barzland (final film)

References

External links

 
 
 

1903 births
1956 deaths
American male film actors
American male stage actors
English male film actors
English emigrants to the United States
English male stage actors
People from Wandsworth
People educated at Stonyhurst College
Male actors from London
Tony Award winners
20th-century American male actors
20th-century English male actors
People with acquired American citizenship
British male comedy actors
British emigrants to the United States
People from Fernhurst